Richard del Rosario (born August 25, 1970) is a Filipino former basketball player who is currently serving as an assistant coach for Barangay Ginebra San Miguel of the PBA. He was drafted in 2nd round by Purefoods Tender Juicy Hotdogs, traded to Mobiline Phone Pals, and played also for Sta. Lucia Realtors and Alaska Aces.

Playing career

Early career 
Del Rosario played for De La Salle Green Archers in the UAAP. His notable teammates were PBA future stars Jun Limpot, Dindo Pumaren, future Benilde coach Dong Vergeire, Joey Santamaria, Terrafirma Dyip coach Johnedel Cardel, Tim Cone's brother-in-law Eddie Villaplana and future PBA Coach of the Year Perry Ronquillo.

Professional career 
He was selected by Purefoods Tender Juicy Hotdogs then-coached by Chot Reyes, but was traded to the Mobiline Phone Pals. He was a part of 2001 Sta. Lucia team that defeated San Miguel Beermen in the Finals. He also played for Alaska Aces when he was traded in 2003, but only for four games.

In 2003, his career was ended by a car accident.

Coaching career 
Del Rosario served as an assistant coach for Caloy Garcia and Gee Abanilla for Benilde Blazers, and later served as the team's coach. He also served as an assistant coach for Rain or Shine Elasto Painters, Star Hotshots and Barangay Ginebra San Miguel.

Coaching record

Collegiate record

Commentary career 
Del Rosario has worked for the ABC, Solar Sports, and One Sports coverages of the PBA.

References 

1970 births
Living people
Alaska Aces (PBA) players
De La Salle Green Archers basketball players
Filipino men's basketball coaches
Magnolia Hotshots draft picks
Filipino men's basketball players
Rain or Shine Elasto Painters coaches
Sta. Lucia Realtors players
TNT Tropang Giga players
Benilde Blazers basketball coaches
Magnolia Hotshots coaches
Barangay Ginebra San Miguel